First Oscar is a 2022 Russian WWII film directed by Sergey Mokritskiy. The film produced by New People Film Company also stars Tikhon Zhiznevsky, Anton Momot and Darya Zhovner.
The film is dedicated to the history of the creation of the Soviet documentary film Moscow Strikes Back directed by Ilya Kopalin and Leonid Varlamov, filmed in record time, was awarded the first ever Oscar for best feature-length documentary in 1943. This is the first Soviet "Oscar" received by Russian cinematographersmen for capturing the course of hostilities and find themselves in the center of the Battle of Moscow in 1941.

First Oscar was theatrically released in Russia on April 21, 2022, by Central Partnership.

Plot 
In 1941 at the beginning of the Great Patriotic War. German troops on the outskirts of Moscow. Twenty-year-old young student cameramen Lev Alperin and Ivan Maisky refuse to leave for evacuation and seek to be sent to the front to be in the center of the grand battle for Moscow with cameras.

Lev Alperin and Ivan Maisky compete for the title of the best cameraman of the course and for the love of the beautiful Yuna from the acting department. When the evacuation begins, the three of them refuse to leave and go to the front: Yuna will perform in a concert team, and Ivan and Lev become military cameramen. Their rivalry continues here, but the trials and horrors of the war, the courage and exploits of the Soviet soldiers, which they witness, change their views on creativity and life. Only thanks to this they manage to shoot shots that will go down in history ...

In parallel with this, the viewer will see the peaceful life of Los Angeles, where the 15th Oscar ceremony of the year began with a sensation – the main Hollywood film award received a documentary from the Soviet Union.

Inspired by real events: filmed in record time, the documentary Moscow Strikes Back, directed by Ilya Kopalin and Leonid Varlamov, won the first ever Oscar for Best Documentary in 1943. This is the first Oscar received by domestic filmmakers.

Cast 
 Tikhon Zhiznevsky as Ivan Maisky
 Anton Momot as Lev Alperin
  as Yuna
 Andrey Merzlikin as Ilya Kopalin
  as Leonid Varlamov
  as director
  as Nikolai Vlasik

Other cast

Production

Development 

The New People Film Company has begun the Russian stage of filming the First Oscar project, which is dedicated to the memory of front-line operators. The film is made by the creative team of the film Battle for Sevastopol, the Federation of Jewish Communities of Russia invited director Sergey Mokritskiy to the Kremlin to present the award. During the ceremony, Sergey met producer Yegor Odintsov (ru), who told him the story of the first Oscar for Soviet cinema. Mokritskiy liked this story, because the topic of war was always close to him.

Casting 
The leading roles in the film First Oscar will be performed by Tikhon Zhiznevsky, Anton Momot, Darya Zhovner, and Andrey Merzlikin. In addition, Hollywood actors were invited to participate in the film, including Oscar nominee Michael Lerner and Austin Basis.

Filming 
Principal photography began on January 31, 2021, in the town of Medyn, Kaluga Oblast. 
On February 7, the film crew will move to the town of Aleksin, Tula Oblast: filming here will take place until April 30, with the organizational assistance of the Tula Region Film Commission under the government. The premiere of the drama is dedicated to the 80th anniversary of the battle for Moscow.

Release

Theatrical 
The premiere screening of the film First Oscar will take place on April 14 at the Khudozhestvenny cinema in Moscow. The film was theatrically released in the Russian Federation on April 21, 2022, by Central Partnership.

References

External links 
 Official website 
 

2022 films
2020s Russian-language films
2020s historical drama films
2022 war drama films
Russian historical drama films
Russian war drama films
Russian World War II films
Films set in Moscow
Films set in 1941
Horror war films
Films set in the Soviet Union
Military history of Moscow
Eastern Front of World War II films
World War II films based on actual events